A criminal accusation is the process of declaring one's belief in another's liability for that other's criminal action(s).  A criminal accusation may be informally made through a declaration made to the public at large (generally through news media) or by the filing of a formal accusation in a court of law by a person legally entitled to do so, generally on behalf of the state by a criminal prosecutor.

See also
 False accusations
 Indictment
 Information (formal criminal charge)

Criminal law